Muntada al-Ansar was an Islamic Terrorist organization operating in Iraq and multiple other countries. The organization's base was in Malaysia.

Nick Berg 
On May 11, 2004, the website of the militant Islamist group Muntada al-Ansar broadcast a video titled "Sheik Abu Musab al-Zarqawi slaughters an American infidel with his hands and promises former president George W. Bush more", which shows American citizen Nick Berg being decapitated.

The web page, on a site located in Malaysia, was then was shut down a few days after by the domain provider.

It is unclear whether al-Zarqawi is one of the men in the video. Both al-Zarqawi and Muntada al-Ansar are associated with the Al-Qaeda movement.

See also

Abu Musab al-Zarqawi

References

External links
 Muntada al-Ansar (Archive) 

Islamist groups
Jihadist propaganda